The intertestamental period (Protestant) or deuterocanonical period (Catholic and Eastern Orthodox) is the period of time between the events of the protocanonical books and the New Testament. Traditionally, it is considered to cover roughly four hundred years, spanning the ministry of Malachi (c. 420 BC) to the appearance of John the Baptist in the early 1st century AD. It is roughly contiguous with the Second Temple period (516 BC-70 AD) and encompasses the age of Hellenistic Judaism.

It is known by some members of the Protestant community as the "400 Silent Years" because it was a span where no new prophets were raised and God revealed nothing new to the Jewish people. Many of the deuterocanonical books, accepted as scripture by the Catholic Church and Eastern Orthodoxy, were written during this time, as were many pseudepigraphal works, the Biblical apocrypha, the Jewish apocrypha, and the Dead Sea Scrolls. An understanding of the events of the intertestamental period provides historical and literary context for the New Testament.

Significant events

 Beginnings of the Jewish diaspora and Hellenistic Judaism
 Establishment of the first synagogues
 Change in common language from Biblical Hebrew to Aramaic and Hellenistic Greek
 The events of the Maccabean Revolt, as documented in the Books of the Maccabees
 Reign of the Hasmonean and Herodian dynasties, followed by Roman rule
 Production of the Greek Septuagint, the first translation of the Hebrew scriptures into another language
 Writing of the Dead Sea Scrolls, the rediscovery of which became central to modern and contemporary Biblical criticism
 Writing of the deuterocanonical books (biblical apocrypha) and pseudepigrapha

See also
 Babylonian captivity
 Dating the Bible
 Development of the Hebrew Bible canon
 Development of the New Testament canon
 Development of the Old Testament canon
 History of ancient Israel and Judah
 Kings of Judah
 Missing years (Jewish calendar)
 Samaritan Pentateuch

References

Further reading
 The International Standard Bible Encyclopedia, Vol 1, Page 457 "Literary Activity"
 Pfeiffer, Charles F. Between the Testaments. Grand Rapids, Mich.: Baker Book House, 1959. 132 p.
 

1st century BC
2nd century BC
3rd century BC
5th century BC
Christian terminology
Historical eras
Second Temple period